Jean-Pierre Hocké was a Swiss politician who served as High Commissioner of the UNHCR and Director of Operations for the International Committee of the Red Cross.

Personal life and career 
He resigned as High Commissioner on 1 January 1986. In 29 July 2021, he died at the age of 83.

References 

United Nations High Commissioners for Refugees
Swiss politicians